OLGR may refer to:

 "Liquor and Gaming NSW", successor agency to the Office of Liquor, Gaming and Racing, a New South Wales government agency
 Office of Liquor and Gaming Regulation, a Queensland government agency